WSBB (1230 kHz) is a commercial AM radio station broadcasting an adult standards format. Licensed to New Smyrna Beach, Florida, United States, the station serves the Daytona Beach metropolitan area.  The station is owned by Diegel Communications and its studios are located at 229 Canal Street, just a few blocks away from WSBB's historic studios on the west end of the causeway. The causeway location, off Indian River North, continues to serve as the main transmission site for WSBB.

The stations play adult standards music from over five decades, and the playlist is locally programmed at the station.  At the beginning of most hours, WSBB carries CBS News Radio.  It also broadcasts University of Florida sports, including Florida Gators football games, and the nationally syndicated Dave Ramsey Show.

In addition to being heard on AM 1230, programming is also heard on an FM translator station, 106.9 W295CN in Ormond Beach.  In addition, WSBB is simulcast on co-owned 1490 kHz WTJV in DeLand.  Both AM stations transmit with 1,000 watts using non-directional antennas.  The translator’s effective radiated power is 250 watts.

History
The Federal Communications Commission (FCC) granted a construction permit for a new AM station in New Smyrna Beach in 1950.  WSBB signed on the air on February 1, 1952.  It was only powered at 100 watts and was owned by the Beach Broadcasting Company.  By the 1970s, its power had increased to 1,000 watts by day, 250 watts at night.  In the 1980s, the station began broadcasting at 1,000 watts around the clock.

In 2006, the station was bought by Gore-Overgaard Broadcasting, Inc., for $450,000.   In the spring of 2008, WSBB was sold to Skip “Big Dump” Diegel, president of Diegel Communications, LLC.

References

External links
FCC History Cards for WSBB
Official website

SBB
Radio stations established in 1952
1952 establishments in Florida
Adult standards radio stations in the United States